The International School Award is a British Council accreditation scheme rewarding those schools with a notable global element in their curriculum. There are three entry points for schools: Foundation, Intermediate, and Accreditation.

The scheme began in 1999 and since then, over 1,000 International School Awards have been granted.  School re-accreditation is required every three years.

References

External links 
 International School Award

Educational awards in the United Kingdom